The following lists events that happened during 1858 in New Zealand.

Incumbents

Regal and viceregal
Head of State — Queen Victoria
Governor — Colonel Thomas Gore Browne

Government and law
The 2nd Parliament continues.

Speaker of the House — Sir Charles Clifford
Premier — Edward Stafford.
Minister of Finance — William Richmond
Chief Justice — Hon George Arney who had been appointed on 2 September 1857 arrives early in the year.

Events 
Provincial Council Chambers are constructed in Wellington. These will eventually become the seat of Parliament.

Births
 1 April: Frederic Truby King, health reformer, founder of Plunket Society.
 10 June: William Millton, rugby union player
 16 July (in England): John Luke, Mayor of Wellington and politician.
 17 October: John Jenkinson, politician. 
 1 November (in Australia): John Rigg, politician.

Deaths
 8 January: Daniel Wakefield, coloniser and judge.

See also
List of years in New Zealand
Timeline of New Zealand history
History of New Zealand
Military history of New Zealand
Timeline of the New Zealand environment
Timeline of New Zealand's links with Antarctica

References

External links